The Word Formation is a geologic formation in Texas. It preserves fossils dating back to the Permian period. It is probably named for the Old Word Ranch in the Glass Mountains of Brewster County.

Defining formation 
The Wordian age of the Permian Period is named for the Word Formation.

Subdivisions 
The formation is subdivided into three members, from young to old:
 Appel Ranch - Wordian
 China Tank - Roadian
 Willis Ranch - Roadian

Fossil content 
The limestone formation contains marine gastropods, brachiopods and ammonites.

Vertebrate paleofauna 
 Helicoprion davisii

See also 
 List of fossiliferous stratigraphic units in Texas
 Paleontology in Texas

References

Further reading 
 M. Kelly and R. Zangerl. 1976. Helicoprion (Edestidae) in the Permian of West Texas. Journal of Paleontology 50(5):992-994
 G. A. Cooper and R. E. Grant. 1972. Permian brachiopods of west Texas, I. Smithsonian Contributions to Paleobiology 14:1-231
 R. L. Batten. 1958. Permian Gastropoda of the southwestern United States. 2. Pleurotomariacea: Portlockiellidae, Phymatopleuridae, and Eotomariidae. Bulletin of the American Museum of Natural History 114(2):153-246
 E. L. Yochelson. 1956. Permian Gastropoda of the southwestern United States. 1. Euomphalacea, Trochonematacea, Pesudophoracea, Anomphalacea, Craspedostomatacea, and Platyceratacea. Bulletin of the American Museum of Natural History 110(3):173-276
 A. K. Miller and W. M. Furnish. 1940. Permian ammonoids of the Guadalupe Mountain region and adjacent area. Geological Society of America Special Paper 26:1-242
 F. B. Plummer and G. Scott. 1937. Upper Paleozoic ammonites in Texas. The University of Texas Bulletin 3701:1-516
 R. E. King. 1931. The Geology of the Glass Mountains, Texas, Part II, Faunal summary and correlation of the Permian formations with description of Brachiopoda. The University of Texas Bulletin 3042:1-245
 G. H. Girty. 1909. The Guadalupian fauna. United States Geological Survey Professional Paper 58:1-651

Geologic formations of Texas
Permian geology of Texas
 
Roadian
Reef deposits
Limestone formations
Shallow marine deposits
Permian northern paleotropical deposits
Paleontology in Texas
Formations